Frailty may refer to:

Music
 Frailty (The Banner album), a 2008 album by the Banner
 Frailty (Dltzk album), a 2021 album by Dltzk
 Frailty (band), death-doom metal band, from Riga (Latvia) formed in 2003

Other
 Frailty (2001 film), a 2001 psychological thriller film
 Frailty (1921 film), a 1921 British silent drama film
 Frailty syndrome, a collection of medical symptoms

See also
 Frail (disambiguation)
 Frailing or clawhammer, a banjo playing style